is a Japanese speed skater. He competed in the men's 500 metres event at the 1998 Winter Olympics.

References

1974 births
Living people
Japanese male speed skaters
Olympic speed skaters of Japan
Speed skaters at the 1998 Winter Olympics
Sportspeople from Hokkaido